Bruno Bartholome (23 August 1927 – 7 July 1994) was a German long-distance runner. He competed in the marathon at the 1960 Summer Olympics.

References

External links
 

1927 births
1994 deaths
Athletes (track and field) at the 1960 Summer Olympics
German male long-distance runners
German male marathon runners
Olympic athletes of the United Team of Germany
People from Ilm-Kreis
Sportspeople from Thuringia
20th-century German people